The 2017 British Columbia Scotties Tournament of Hearts, the provincial women's curling championship of British Columbia, was held from January 17 to 22 at Duncan Curling Club in Duncan, British Columbia. The winning Marla Mallett team will represent British Columbia at the 2017 Scotties Tournament of Hearts in St. Catharines, Ontario.

Walnut Grove's Marla Mallett defeated her former teammate in Diane Gushulak in the final. Gushulak was a member of the Mallett link the last time Mallett won the provincial championship, in 2009. The Mallett team included Shannon Aleksic from Abbotsford and sisters Brette Richards and Blaine de Jager who are originally from Prince George.

The event was considered a "huge success" by the organizing committee, and was the most important event ever to be held at the Duncan Curling Club.

Teams
The teams were listed as follows:

Round-robin standings

Results
Round-robin results are as follows:

Draw 1
Hudyma 8-4 Thompson
Mallett 7-4 Wark
Gushulak 7-6 Pewarchuk
Van Osch 10-2 Herndier
Draw 2
Van Osch 8-4 Wark
Pewarchuk 4-6 Hudyma
Herndier 2-8 Mallett
Gushulak 6-5 Thompson
Draw 3
Pewarchuk 3-10 Wark
Thompson 12-5 Van Osch
Mallett 8-5 Gushulak
Hudyma 7-5 Herndier
Draw 4
Mallett 8-6 Pewarchuk
Herndier 10-5 Thompson
Wark 7-5 Gushulak
Hudyma 6-4 Van Osch
Draw 5
Wark 4-8 Thompson
Gushulak 6-4 Van Osch
Mallett 10-6 Hudyma
Pewarchuk 7-6 Herndier
Draw 6
Gushulak 7-4 Herndier
Hudyma 4-10 Wark
Van Osch 10-6 Pewarchuk
Thompson 5-6 Mallett
Draw 7
Mallett 2-6 Van Osch
Thompson 7-8 Pewarchuk
Wark 8-6 Herndier
Hudyma 7-3 Gushulak

Tie-breaker
Gushulak 8-7 Van Osch

Playoffs

1 vs 2
Saturday, January 21, 2:00 pm

3 vs 4
Saturday, January 21, 7:00 pm

Semi-final
Saturday, January 21, 11:00 am

Final
Saturday, January 21, 7:00 pm

References

External links
Official site 

2017 Scotties Tournament of Hearts
Scotties Tournament of Hearts, 2017
Scotties Tournament of Hearts, 2017
Scotties Tournament of Hearts, 2017
January 2017 sports events in Canada